Rattan Lal Kataria is an Indian politician from Haryana. He served as the Minister of State in the Ministry of Jal Shakti and Ministry of Social Justice and Empowerment till 7 July 2021. He is a member of the 16th Lok Sabha. He got elected to 16th Lok Sabha from Ambala as a candidate of the Bharatiya Janata Party by 612,121 votes while total vote polled was 1,220,121 by defeating INC candidate Raj Kumar Balmiki. Previously, he was elected to 13th Lok Sabha from Ambala as a candidate of the Bharatiya Janata Party. He was born on 19 December 1951, and educated at Kurukshetra University.

Career
In May 2019, Kataria became Minister of State for Jal Shakti and Social Justice and Empowerment. He served as the President of the Bharatiya Janata Party, Haryana unit from 2000 to 2003 and during his tenure BJP Haryana unit was start own magazine Bhajpa Ki Baat in October 2000.

References

India MPs 1999–2004
Living people
People from Ambala
1951 births
Lok Sabha members from Haryana
Kurukshetra University alumni
India MPs 2014–2019
Bharatiya Janata Party politicians from Haryana
India MPs 2019–present
Narendra Modi ministry